Underwater rugby (UWR) is an underwater team sport. During a match two teams try to score a negatively buoyant ball (filled with saltwater) into the opponents’ goal at the bottom of a swimming pool.  It originated from within the physical fitness training regime existing in German diving clubs during the early 1960s and has little in common with rugby football except for the name.  It was recognised by the Confédération Mondiale des Activités Subaquatiques (CMAS) in 1978 and was first played as a world championship in 1980.

Play
It is played under water in a pool with a depth of 3.5m to 5m and goals (heavy metal buckets with a diameter of about 40 cm) at the bottom of the pool. Two teams (blue and white), each with six players (plus six substitutes), try to score a goal by sending the slightly negatively buoyant ball (filled with saltwater) into the opponents’ goal. It is a fast and exhausting game; therefore, the subs replace their players on the fly.

The ball may be passed in any direction but must not leave the water.  It "flies" about 2m or 3m before water resistance stops it. This makes good tactics and good (three-dimensional) positioning essential. The players need all sorts of different abilities: strength, speed, agility or good teamplay are all similarly important.

History 
In 1961 a member of the German Underwater Club (DUC) in Cologne, Ludwig von Bersuda, came up with the idea of an underwater ball game. Air-filled balls are not suitable for underwater games, as they are buoyant and always return to the surface. The first underwater ball was invented when Bersuda filled the ball with saltwater. Since the density of the ball was now greater than that of normal water, it no longer floated to the surface, but slowly sank to the bottom. The sink rate could, within certain limits, be controlled by the concentration of the salt solution. As footballs are too large to be practical, waterpolo balls are used.

Ludwig von Bersuda spanned the middle of the pool with a net, as in volleyball, that stopped 1 m above the pool bottom. Two teams played against each other: the offensive team had to carry the ball to the opposing field and put it into a bucket. The idea for the game was ready, and the DUC Cologne used it to warm up before normal training. Other teams saw this and started to use saltwater-filled balls themselves.

The "Cologne Discipline" was demonstrated as a competition sport at the national games in 1963, probably the first official game with an underwater ball. At the time, though, there was not much interest shown.

Dr. Franz Josef Grimmeisen, a member of the German Underwater Club in Duisburg, a city near Cologne, decided to make a competitive sport from this ball game. The German Lifeguard Association (DLRG) of Mülheim (since 1967 TSC Mülheim/Ruhr) had founded a divers' club, and through contact with members of DUC Duisburg learned of the game.  With their help, Grimmeisen arranged the first underwater rugby game on Sunday October 4, 1964. It took place between DLRG Mülheim and DUC Duisburg. DUC Duisburg won the game 5–2. The next edition of the Essener Tageblatt carried the story.

Grimmeisen kept promoting the ideas of an underwater rugby tournament to give the sport a character of serious competition. Together with the scuba-diving section of the DUC Mülheim/Ruhr, to which six players of DUC Duisburg came, he organized the first underwater rugby tournament rules, and the "Battle for the Golden Ball" in Hallenbad Sued, in Mülheim/Ruhr. The premiere was on November 5, 1965. Six clubs sent teams to Mülheim: DUC Bochum; DUC Düsseldorf, DUC Duisburg, DUC Essen and TSC Delphin Lüdenscheid. The rules of those days allowed 8-player teams, and DLRG Mülheim, the home team, came away winners, against DUC Duisburg (for whom Dr. Grimmeisen played).

The tournament has been held every year since then, which makes it the oldest tournament in the history of the sport. The Cologne version of the game was only played for a short time thereafter in Cologne, and has been long since forgotten. The Cologne team itself also turned to underwater rugby. To bring this game to the international arena, Grimmeisen turned to the two then most important members of CMAS, France and the USSR. He offered demonstration games and press coverage. Interest was not forthcoming. Just one French sport magazine, L'Equipe, printed a short article in its April 9, 1965 edition.

The Scandinavian countries showed more interest, and adopted the ideas in relatively short time. A demonstration in Denmark in 1973 and in Finland in 1975 were effective. Games in Belgium in September 1973 and Vienna in 1979 were ineffective in generating interest. In the Eastern Bloc, only Czech teams were interested, and they, according to the politics of the time, played only against teams from other communist countries. The only tournament known to have taken place  there is the Underwater Rugby Tournament in Prague, which has taken place every year since 1975 (with the exception of 1979). In later years, Polish teams participated as well, and teams from East Germany, who used the game for conditioning, sent observers.

Since 1972, when the game was recognized as a sport by the Union of German Sport Divers (VDST), official German Championships have taken place. (An unofficial German Championship took place in 1971.) The first German Championship was held in Mülheim, and the first German Champions were TSC Mülheim.

In 1978, underwater rugby was officially recognized by CMAS, and from 28 to 30 April 1978, the first European Championships took place in Malmö, Sweden, and from 15 to 18 May 1980, the first World Championships in Mülheim.

A different version of the current waterpolo became popular in the US, similar to underwater rugby, until US teams conformed to the international waterpolo rules around 2014.

The sport has little in common with rugby football except for the name.

Governing body 
The governing body is  the  Confédération Mondiale des Activités Subaquatiques (CMAS) Underwater Rugby Commission.  As of June 2013, the following countries and territories have affiliated with the commission: Austria, Bosnia-Herzegovina, Colombia, Cyprus, Czech Republic, Denmark, Finland, Germany, Hong Kong, Hungary, Italy, Japan, Norway, Russia, South Africa, Spain, Sweden, Switzerland, Turkey, United States of America and Venezuela.

International competition 

Major championships have been conducted at continental level within Europe for senior teams since 1978 and for junior teams since 1986.  World championships have been conducted since 1980.  A number of regional competitions are also conducted - these include the International Underwater Rugby Tournament and the Champions Cup in Europe and the North American Underwater Rugby Tournament in North America.

European Underwater Rugby League 

In the first season, the four strongest clubs of Europe take part in the Euroleague: Swedish Malmo, Norwegian Molde, Danish Flipper and Russian Betta. The first winner of the Eurleague, based on the results of three rounds - became the Norwegian Molde.

Domestic competition 

 Underwater rugby in Australia
 Underwater rugby in Canada
 Underwater rugby in Colombia
 Underwater rugby in Czech Republic
 Underwater rugby in England 
 Underwater rugby in Germany
 Underwater rugby in Greece
 Underwater rugby in France
 Underwater rugby in Italy
 Underwater rugby in Russia
 Underwater rugby in Spain
 Underwater rugby in Singapore
 Underwater rugby in Sweden
 Underwater rugby in Switzerland
 Underwater rugby in USA
 Underwater rugby in Venezuela
 Underwater rugby in Mexico
 Underwater rugby in Turkey
 Underwater rugby in New Zealand
 Underwater rugby in Norway
 Underwater rugby in Hungary

See also

References

External links 
CMAS Underwater Rugby Commission
Underwaterrugby Clubs – World Map
History of CMAS - Rugby
 Henrik Stewenius: Underwater Rugby: Swedish Tactic, 2008
 Underwater rugby in New Zealand
 Underwater Rugby in Sportalsub.net
UWR.ZONE

 
Freediving
Sports originating in Germany
Team sports